Elisa Yahya Basna (born 4 February 1996), is an Indonesian professional footballer who plays as a attacking midfielder or winger for Liga 1 club Persita Tangerang.

Club career

Persipura Jayapura
In 2017, Basna signed a two-years contract with Indonesian Liga club Persipura Jayapura. He made his professional debut on 23 April 2017 in a match against Bali United. On 20 October 2018, Basna scored his first goal for Persipura in the 87th minute against Madura United at the Gelora Ratu Pamelingan Stadium, Pamekasan.

Persebaya Surabaya
In 2019, Basna signed a year contract with Liga 1 club Persebaya Surabaya. He made his league debut on 16 May 2019 in a match against Bali United at the Kapten I Wayan Dipta Stadium, Gianyar.

Persita Tangerang
He was signed for Persita Tangerang to play in Liga 1 in the 2020 season. Basna made his league debut on 1 March 2020 in a match against Bali United at the Kapten I Wayan Dipta Stadium, Gianyar. This season was suspended on 27 March 2020 due to the COVID-19 pandemic. The season was abandoned and was declared void on 20 January 2021.

Return to Persipura Jayapura
In 2021, Basna signed a year contract with Liga 1 club Persipura Jayapura. He made his league debut on 10 September 2021 in a match against Persela Lamongan at the Wibawa Mukti Stadium, Cibinong.

Return to Persita Tangerang
Basna was signed for Persita Tangerang to play in Liga 1 in the 2022–23 season. He made his league debut on 25 July 2022 in a match against Persik Kediri at the Indomilk Arena, Tangerang.

Personal life
Basna's brother, Yanto Basna is also a football player.

Honours

Club
Persebaya Surabaya
 Liga 1 runner-up: 2019
 Indonesia President's Cup runner-up: 2019

References

External links
 
 Elisa Basna at Liga Indonesia

1996 births
Living people
People from Sorong
Papuan people
Indonesian footballers
Liga 1 (Indonesia) players
Association football midfielders
Persita Tangerang players
Persebaya Surabaya players
Persipura Jayapura players